Wayne Gretzky Hockey 2 is a 1990 ice hockey-themed sports game from Bethesda Softworks. The game is a sequel to the 1988 Wayne Gretzky Hockey.

Gameplay

The game is rendered two-dimensionally (from directly above the ice). Unlike the original Wayne Gretzky Hockey where two players could compete only against each other, in Gretzky 2 two friends can play on the same team.

Reception

PC Joker rated the game 77 of 100, stating "Of course, the good Wayne remains unchallenged on the first place in the table because, in terms of graphics, sound, handling (mouse, joy, buttons) and realism, none of the competitors can still outdo him. But a simple update would have achieved the same thing at half the price"

German magazine Aktueller Software Markt rated the game an 8.8 of 12 stating "Of course, the question arises: Is it worth it for owners of WGH to loosen up another 90 Marker to get WGH II? I do not think so, because the real strengths of the program, lie in the action on the ice. And after all, very little has changed in this. Those who do not yet call the precursor their own, however, should buy WGH II, because the new features provide additional variety and long-term motivation"

References 

1990 video games
Amiga games
Bethesda Softworks games
DOS games
Ice hockey video games
Video games developed in the United States
Video game sequels
Wayne Gretzky games